The Norwegian football league system, or pyramid, is a series of interconnected leagues for club football in Norway.

2017 system in men's football
, the current national league system administered by the NFF is organised as 1–1–2–6, where Eliteserien is the highest level and the First Division the second tier, followed by two groups in the third tier (Second Division) and 6 regional groups in the fourth tier (Third Division). The leagues in the fifth tier (Fourth Division) and below are regional divisions administered by the various regional football associations. The regional leagues mostly follow county borders.

Promotion and relegation

2021 system in women's football
, the league system for the top two divisions in Norwegian women's football is organised like this:

Promotion and relegation

References

 
Norway